The King's Remembrancer (or Queen's Remembrancer) is an ancient judicial post in the legal system of England and Wales. Since the Lord Chancellor no longer sits as a judge, the Remembrancer is the oldest judicial position in continual existence. The post was created in  1154 by King Henry II as the chief official in the Exchequer Court, whose purpose was "to put the Lord Treasurer and the Barons of Court in remembrance of such things as were to be called upon and dealt with for the benefit of the Crown", a primary duty being to keep records of the taxes, paid and unpaid.

The first King's Remembrancer was Richard of Ilchester, a senior servant of the Crown and later Bishop of Winchester. The King's Remembrancer continued to sit in the Court of the Exchequer until its abolition in 1882. The post of King's Remembrancer is held by the Senior Master of the King's Bench Division of the High Court.

Quit Rents ceremonies
The Exchequer Court is reconstituted every year for the three ancient ceremonies of the "Rendering of the Quit Rents to the Crown" by the City of London at the Royal Courts of Justice.

The oldest dates from 1211, where the City pays service for two pieces of land, The Moors near Bridgnorth in Shropshire, for which the City must pay two knives, one blunt and one sharp.

The second oldest has been made, entered in the Great Roll of the Exchequer, since 1235, for 'The Forge' in Tweezer's Alley, just south of St Clement Danes, near the Strand in London, for which the City must pay six horseshoes and 61 horseshoe nails – these are over 550 years old, since after being rendered to the King's Remembrancer they are preserved in his office, and with the permission of the Crown they are loaned to the Corporation of London to be rendered again the following year.

These two quits are paid together as one ceremony, during which a black-and-white chequered cloth is spread out – it is from this that the word "Exchequer" derives – combined with the introduction to the Remembrancer of the City's newly elected sheriffs.

The Comptroller and Solicitor of the City of London presents the horseshoes and nails and counts them out to the Remembrancer who then pronounces "Good number." The knives are tested by the King's Remembrancer by taking a hazel stick, one cubit in length, and bending it over the blunt knife and leaving a mark, and the stick is split in two with the sharp knife. This practice stems from the creation of tally sticks where a mark was made on a stick with a blunt knife for each payment counted. When payment was complete the stick was split down the middle, leaving each party with half of the marked stick and creating a receipt (or foil and counter-foil). After the knives are tested the Remembrancer pronounces "Good service".

The third quit rent dates from 1327, and is for £11 in regard to the reserved interest of the Crown for the 'town of Southwark'. In that year the City was granted its fourth-oldest Royal Charter to acquire Southwark from Edward III for this annual payment. It was specifically retained by Edward VI in the 1550 charter to the City, which extended its jurisdiction over the outlying parts of Southwark. This quit is rendered by the Foreman of the City's Court Leet Jury of the "Town and Borough of Southwark", alias Guildable Manor, which is the area as defined in 1327. The continuation of this body is sanctioned under the Administration of Justice Act 1977. The ceremony takes place in the Cathedral library, the Glaziers' Hall or London's City Hall. This sum is rendered onto the Exchequer Cloth in the form of Crowns (5 shilling pieces, equivalent to 25 new pence), which remain legal tender. The Remembrancer pronounces "Good service" and this is witnessed by the Clerk of the City's Chamberlain's Court and the manor jurors to note that the payment has been made.

Trial of the Pyx

The Trial of the Pyx is a ceremony dating from 1249, formerly held in the Exchequer Court, now in Goldsmiths' Hall. The King's Remembrancer swears in a jury of 26 Goldsmiths who then count, weigh and otherwise measure a sample of 88,000 gold coins produced by the Royal Mint. The term "Pyx" refers to the name of the box in which the coins are kept.

Forest of Dean
In 1688, King James II directed the King's Remembrancer to appoint Commissioners to supervise the planting of trees in the Forest of Dean. The Forest was an important source of iron, coal and timber to the Monarch, but had been neglected during the Commonwealth.

Other responsibilities
The King's Remembrancer is responsible for nomination of the high sheriffs to each county of England and Wales, except Cornwall, Greater Manchester, Lancashire and Merseyside, who are selected by the Duke of Lancaster (i.e. the sovereign) via the Pricking ceremony.

The Remembrancer presents the Lord Mayor of the City of London to the Lord Chief Justice, Master of the Rolls and other High Court judges at the Royal Courts of Justice on Lord Mayor's Day.

The King's Remembrancer presents newly appointed Sheriffs of the City with a Writ of Approbation from the monarch, sealed with the Great Silver Seal of the Exchequer. This takes place at the same time as the Quit Rents.

List of Remembrancers

John Troutbeck and Thomas Daniel of Frodsham (appointed 1447)
John FitzHerbert (d. 1502), father-in-law of John Port, Justice of the King's Bench
John Jessop, 22 April 1513 - 21 April 1514
William Forman, 22 April 1538 - 21 April 1540
Sir Christopher More, 1542–1549
Thomas Saunders, 1549–1565 
Henry Fanshawe, 1565–1568 
Thomas Fanshawe, 1568–1601 
Sir Henry Fanshawe, 1601–1616 
Christopher Hatton, 1616–1619 
Sir Thomas Fanshawe 1619–1641 
Richard Fanshawe 1641 – c. 1642 (deprived of office by Parliament as a Royalist)
Humphrey Salwey, 28 September 1644 – 6 December 1652
John Dodington, 29 July 1658 – c. 1659
Thomas Fanshawe, 1st Viscount Fanshawe, 7 August 1660 – 26 March 1665
Thomas Fanshawe, 2nd Viscount Fanshawe, 26 March 1665 – 19 May 1674
Vere Bertie, 19 May 1674 – 4 June 1675
Henry Ayloffe, 4 June 1674 – 13 September 1708
Henry Stevens, 23 October 1708 – 25 June 1709. Temporarily appointed by the Barons of Exchequer while the rights of Charles Fanshawe, 4th Viscount Fanshawe and Simon Fanshawe to the office were settled; Charles, who had the next reversion, was a Jacobite and would not subscribe to the oaths required
Simon Fanshawe, 5th Viscount Fanshawe, 13 September 1708 – 23 October 1716 (appointment retroactive)
Samuel Masham, 1st Baron Masham, 23 October 1716 – 16 October 1758
Samuel Masham, 2nd Baron Masham, 16 October 1758 – 14 June 1776
Felton Hervey and his son Felton Lionel Hervey, 14 June 1776 – 9 September 1785
Edward James Eliot, 4 October 1785 – 20 September 1797
Thomas Steele, 2 November 1797 – 8 December 1823
Henry William Vincent, 18 December 1823 – 1 February 1858
William Henry Walton, 1858–1874
Sir William Frederick Pollock, 2nd Baronet, 1874–1886
George Frederick Pollock, 1886 – December 1901
Robert St John Fitzwalter Butler, 16th Baron Dunboyne, December 1901 – 1905
James Robert Mellor, 1905–1912
Sir John Macdonell, 1912–1920
Thomas Willes Chitty, 1920–1927
Sir George A. Bonner, 1927–1937
Ernest Arthur Jelf, 1937–1943
W. Valentine Ball, 1943–1947
Sir Percy Reginald Simner, 1947–1950
Sir Frederick Arnold-Baker, 1951–1957
Sir Richard Frank Burnand, 1958–1960?
Sir Anthony Highmore King, 1960–1962
Claude Herbert Grundy, 1962–1965
B.A. Harwood, 1965–1970
Sir (William) Russell Lawrence, 1970–1975
Sir Jack Jacob, 1975–1980
John Ritchie, 1980–1982
John Bullen Elton, 1982–1983
J. R. Bickford-Smith, 1983–1987
Ian Warren, 1988–1990±
Keith Topley, 1990–1996
Robert Lockley Turner, 1996 – 1 October 2007
Steven Dixon Whitaker, 2 October 2007 – February 2014 (resigned from office after misconduct was proven in his work diary scheduling)
John Leslie, February 2014 – 19 October 2014 (Acting Queen's Remembrancer pending appointment of a permanent Remembrancer)
Barbara Fontaine, 20 October 2014 – present (first female holder of the post)

See also
King's and Lord Treasurer's Remembrancer - successor to the Queen's/King's Remembrancer of the Court of Exchequer in Scotland
City Remembrancer - a senior officer of the City of London Corporation.

Citations
FANSHAWE, Henry I (c.1506-68), of London.

HENRY FANSHAWE, QUEEN'S REMEMBRANCER

HATTON, Christopher II (c.1581-1619), of Clay Hall, Barking, Essex and Kirby Hall, Northants.

References

J. C. Sainty (comp.), Officers of the Exchequer (List and Index Society, Special Series 18, 1983), 40.

External links
King's Remembrancer
King`s Remembrancer: Memoranda Rolls and Enrolment Books online records of The National Archives
The Trial of the Pyx

Judiciary of England and Wales
Ceremonial officers in the United Kingdom
Exchequer offices
1154 establishments in England
Forest of Dean